Presidential elections were held in Niger on 7 and 8 July 1996. They followed the approval of a new constitution in a referendum in May after a military coup had removed the first democratically elected President Mahamane Ousmane from office in January. Colonel Ibrahim Baré Maïnassara, who had been installed as leader following the coup, won the elections in the first round, claiming 52.22% of the vote, with a 66.4% turnout.

Results

References

Niger
1996 in Niger
Presidential elections in Niger